Elif may refer to:

People
Elif (name)
Begünhan Elif Ünsal (born 1993), Turkish archer
Elif Ağca (born 1984), Turkish volleyball player
Elif Batuman (born 1977), American author, academic, journalist
Elif Demirezer (born 1992), German-Turkish pop singer and songwriter
Elif Deniz (born 1993), Turkish footballer
Elif Elmas (born 1998), footballer from North Macedonia
Elif Gülbayrak (born 1988), Turkish volleyball player
Elif Jale Yeşilırmak (born 1986), Turkish wrestler of Russian origin
Elif Keskin (born 2002), Turkish women's footballer
Elif Kızılkaya (born 1991), Turkish curler
Elif Köroğlu, Turkish football referee
Elif Shafak, Turkish-British writer and activist
Elif Sıla Aydın (born 1996), Turkish handball player
Elif Yıldırım (born 1990), Turkish middle-distance runner

Other
 Elif, Gaziantep, a town in the Araban District of Gaziantep Province, Turkey
 Elif (TV series), a Turkish TV series
 In computing, used as part of a Structured If (short for else if)
 First letter of the alphabet:
 A
 Aleph
 Alpha

Turkish feminine given names
Turkish unisex given names